The Mexican chickadee (Poecile sclateri) is a small songbird, a passerine bird in the tit family Paridae. It is still often placed in the genus Parus with most other tits, but mtDNA cytochrome b sequence data and morphology suggest that separating Poecile more adequately expresses these birds' relationships (Gill et al., 2005). The American Ornithologists' Union had been treating Poecile as distinct genus for some time already.

Adults are 12.5–13.5 cm long with a wingspan of 18–21 cm and a weight of 7.5–11 g. Both sexes have a black cap, white cheeks, and a short black bill. Their backs and flanks are gray and they have paler grayish underparts. Similar in appearance to the black-capped chickadee and mountain chickadee, the Mexican chickadee can be distinguished by its longer black bib, which extends from its chin down onto its upper breast. A whitish band below the bib extends down the center of the belly.

It is a permanent resident of wooded highlands in western, central and northeastern Mexico, the range extends north into extreme southeastern Arizona and southwestern New Mexico. Although primarily nonmigratory, Mexican chickadees sometimes fly to lower elevations during the cold of winter.

The Mexican chickadee's song is distinct from other chickadees; it is a complex burry trilled whistle of chischu-wur and a rich cheelee. They travel in pairs or small groups, and may join multi-species feeding flocks.

The nest is constructed by the female in a snag or tree cavity up to 18 m above the ground, and consists of grasses, moss, strips of bark, and is lined with animal fur. She lays between five and eight ovate white eggs, marked with fine reddish brown spots. Their breeding biology is not well known, but it is estimated that eggs are incubated for 11–14 days by the female, and the altricial young fledge in 18–21 days.

References

 Alsop, F. J., III (2001). Smithsonian Birds of North America, Western Region. DK Publishing, Inc., New York City. 
Del Hoyo, J., Elliot, A., & Christie D. (eds). (2007). Handbook of the Birds of the World. Volume 12: Picathartes to Tits and Chickadees. Lynx Edicions. 
Gill, F. B., Slikas, B., & Sheldon, F. H. (2005). Phylogeny of titmice (Paridae): II. Species relationships based on sequences of the mitochondrial cytochrome-b gene. Auk 122: 121–143. DOI: 10.1642/0004-8038(2005)122[0121:POTPIS]2.0.CO;2 HTML abstract

External links
 Photos, videos and observations at Cornell Lab of Ornithologys Birds of the World
 

Mexican chickadee
Birds of Mexico
Native birds of the Southwestern United States
Mexican chickadee
Mexican chickadee
Birds of the Sierra Madre Occidental